Phenacyl chloride, also commonly known as chloroacetophenone, is a substituted acetophenone. It is a useful building block in organic chemistry. Apart from that, it has been historically used as a riot control agent, where it is designated CN. It should not be confused with cyanide, another agent used in chemical warfare, which has the chemical structure CN−.

Preparation
Phenacyl chloride is readily available and was first prepared by chlorination of acetophenone vapour. It may also be synthesized by the Friedel-Crafts acylation of benzene using chloroacetyl chloride, with an aluminium chloride catalyst:

Riot control agent
It was investigated, but not used, during the First and Second World Wars.

Because of its significantly greater toxicity, it has largely been supplanted by CS gas. Even though CN is still supplied to paramilitary and police forces in a small pressurized aerosol known as “Mace” or tear gas, its use is falling as pepper spray both works and disperses more quickly than CN and is less toxic than CN.

The term "Mace" came into being because it was the brand-name invented by one of the first American manufacturers of CN aerosol sprays. Subsequently, in the United States, Mace became synonymous with tear-gas sprays in the same way that Kleenex has become strongly associated with facial tissues (a phenomenon known as a genericized trademark).

Like CS gas, this compound irritates the mucous membranes (oral, nasal, conjunctival and tracheobronchial). Sometimes it can give rise to more generalized reactions such as syncope, temporary loss of balance and orientation. More rarely, cutaneous irritating outbreaks have been observed and allergic contact permanent dermatitis.

At high concentrations, CN may cause corneal epithelial damage and chemosis. It has also accounted for at least five deaths, which have resulted from pulmonary injury and/or asphyxia.

TRPA1 (Transient Receptor Potential-Ankyrin 1) ion channel expressed on nociceptors (especially trigeminal) has been implicated as the site of action for CN, in vivo and in vitro

References

External links

Riot control agents
Lachrymatory agents
Organochlorides
Aromatic ketones
Acetophenones